A'oloau is a village in the west of Tutuila Island, American Samoa. It is also known as A’oloaufou, which means "new A’olou". An abandoned area in town by A'oloau Bay is known as A'oloautuai, which means Old A’oloau’. A'oloau's nickname is Nuu Puaolele which means the Fog Village.

The village is reached from a road near Shins Mart in the village of Pava'ia'i. It sits inland, high on the central plain of Tutuila. A hiking trail from A’oloaufou leads down to A'asu on Massacre Bay. A’asu was the site where Frenchman Jean-François de Galaup, comte de Lapérouse visited in 1787. Lapérouse explored and mapped the various Samoan Islands when he arrived in A’asu on December 11, 1787. A battle broke out between the French and the native Samoans, and several French and Samoans were killed.

Etymology
A’oloau, which is pronounced A-olo-au, translates as “to row with the sea current.” Its origin traces to an open-sea experience of the ancestors. The word A’oloau emanates from the daily activity of boat-rowing in the open sea in order to sustain life and for transportation. Before major developments in the early 1940s, the village was located in the low-lying coastal areas on the north shores. This settlement is referred to as A'oloau Tuai (Old A’oloau).

History

A’oloau Tuai (Old A’oloau) is separated from the more populated villages on Tutuila's south coast, and transportation to and from the village was difficult. Ocean and land transportation were equally difficult due to the rugged terrain surrounding the village as well as the rough sea currents facing its forefront. The men of A’oloau Tuai were among the best fishermen on the island; however, after the village moved to the Mount Olotele mountaintop eighty years ago, they raised livestock and became skilled farmers. Since then, A’oloau farms have become reliable sources of food staples for Tutuila Island.

In the early 1940s, major changes happened throughout Tutuila as a result of World War II. Public roads were mapped and constructed, including the road to A’oloau. Village leaders took heed of this opportunity to make the move, which had been discussed for years. The move to the flat land on top of Mount Olotele was the best decision, particularly for the younger generations. By the end of the decade, most residents had moved to the mountaintop. It has become a tradition for villagers to visit their original settlement to share the village folklore and tales with the children.

Geography

A’oloau is a village on the top of Mount Olotele. It is the highest village settlement on Tutuila Island. Its strategic location provides a view of the entire island, even as far as Aunu'u Island on clear days. The village is twelve miles from Pago Pago. It is uniquely located on the opposite side of the main road from Aasu village. Due to its high elevation, Aoloau's climate is cool throughout the year compared to most Tutuila communities. The village is covered by fog on cloudy days. The village icon is the Puaolele (flying cloud). Mount Olotele is the location of private and government antennas and satellite dishes. From the mountain, you can see as far as to south shore villages on Tutuila and Aunu'u Island to the southeastern part of Tutuila. On top of the steep rise is panoramic 270-degree views of valleys, Rainmaker Mountain, Matafao Mountain, Tafuna Plain, and as far as the Pacific Ocean.

Demographics

A'oloau was home to 615 people as of the 2010 U.S. Census. According to the 2000 U.S. Census, the population was 778 and 53 percent of the village population were males. Both Censuses found more than fifty percent of the population to be at the age of fifty or younger.

Massacre Bay Trail
A’oloaufou is home to a hiking trail which leads to the village of Aasu. Aasu is a historic village where, on December 11, 1787, twelve men from the La Pérouse’ ships La Boussole and Astrolabe and 39 Samoans were killed in a battle. Aasu is a near-abandoned village which is home to just a few families. Aasu village has no road outlet, and can only be reached by hiking trails.

The trail from A’oloaufou takes off downhill just east of a colorful garden which was created by Department of Tourism. It is a 2.5-mile trail which leads to the beach and monument in Aasu. The trail down is mostly made of volcanic clay which may be muddy, waxy and treacherous when wet. It is possible to camp at Aasu village before returning to A’oloaufou. Other trails in A’oloaufou includes a trail to the abandoned village of A’oloautuai, as well as another trail leading down the ridge to the village of Fagamalo.

Education
Village leaders have been successful in getting the American Samoa Government to construct an elementary school in the village, in order to serve the children of Aasu and A'oloau villages. The school is situated on a hillside above the church. High school students attend Leone High School. Many of the village's youth and young adults serve in the U.S. Army and work in the American Samoa government.

References

Villages in American Samoa